Reginald Phillips ( – March 1924) was an English professional footballer who played primarily as a full back, but made three Football League Third Division South appearances for Brighton & Hove Albion at outside left.

Phillips was born in Hove, Sussex, in around 1900. He played for Brighton & Hove Amateurs during and after the First World War, and turned professional with Albion in 1920. He was a member of their reserve team that won the 1920–21 Southern League title, and made his debut in the Football League in September 1921. Illness put an end to his football career during the following season, and he died in Hove in March 1924 at the age of 23. Albion's reserves played a benefit match against Southampton in support of his family.

References

1900s births
1924 deaths
People from Hove
English footballers
Association football fullbacks
Association football outside forwards
Brighton & Hove Albion F.C. players
English Football League players
Southern Football League players